Denis Petro (born 18 June 1999) is a professional Slovak footballer who currently plays for Fortuna Liga club Zemplín Michalovce as a defender.

Club career

MFK Zemplín Michalovce
Petro made his professional Fortuna Liga debut for Zemplín Michalovce against Ružomberok on 13 April 2019. Petro played 90 minutes of the 0:1 away loss.

References

External links
 MFK Zemplín Michalovce official club profile 
 
 
 Futbalnet profile 

1999 births
Living people
Slovak footballers
Association football defenders
S.S. Lazio players
Expatriate footballers in Italy
MFK Zemplín Michalovce players
Slovak Super Liga players
People from Michalovce
Sportspeople from the Košice Region